Volt Belgium (short name: Volt) is a political party in Belgium. It is part of the pan-European party Volt Europa.

History 
Volt has been active in Belgium since 2017 and was officially founded as a party on 28 July 2018. It was the first national section to participate in the elections. In April 2022, the party elected the German-French Johanna Dirlewanger-Lücke and the German-Italian Carlo Giovanni Giudiceneue as new party leaders.

Elections 
The party participated in the 2018 municipal elections in Ixelles (0,58 %) and Etterbeek (1,58 %), and on a list with the local Pirate Party in Antwerp. In the 2019 European Parliament election, Volt only participated in the Dutch-language electoral college and received 0.48% of the vote. In the 2019 Belgian parliamentary election, Volt participated in the Antwerp constituency and received 1669 votes, representing 0.14 % of the vote in the constituency and 0.02 % of the vote nationally.

Election results

External links 

 Official website

References 

Belgium
Political parties in Belgium
2018 establishments in Belgium
Political parties established in 2018
Pro-European political parties in Belgium